Anthony Ralph Epperson (born November 1, 1937) is an American writer and conspiracy theorist. He is known for his anti-Masonic opinions.

Theories
Epperson is a proponent of the conspiratorial view of history, which holds that "historical events occur by design for reasons that are not generally made known to the people," in contrast to the mainstream view, termed the accidental view of history, which according to Epperson holds that "historical events occur by accident, for no apparent reason" and "no one really knows why events happen—they just do."

Appearances
History Channel's Decoding the Past: Secrets of the Dollar Bill (S2Ep29)

Bibliography
Books
The Unseen Hand: An Introduction Into the Conspiratorial View of History, 1982 (.pdf format)
The New World Order, 1990 
Masonry: Conspiracy Against Christianity - Evidence That the Masonic Lodge Has a Secret Agenda, 1998
Jesse James: United States Senator, 2005
The New World Order ebook, November 6, 2008 

Audio
Secret Societies, 1987
Audio interview conducted by (Milton) William Cooper, on his radio program, "Hour Of The Time" ('The Secret Agenda of Freemasonry, 1997Victor Thorn Interviews Ralph Epperson, January 12, 2006 Freemasonry, October 11, 2010 Freemasonry 2, August 6, 2011 

Video$10 a Gallon Gasoline, May 13, 2010 New World Order - 1-7, June 7, 2010  America's Secret Destiny Parts 1 and 2, July 30, 2010 Only the US has Nukes, November 6, 2010 America Alone has Nukes'', May 17, 2015

See also
Freemasonry
Secret society
New World Order (conspiracy theory)
Jesse James

References

External links
Official website

American male writers
Anti-Masonry
American conspiracy theorists
Living people
1937 births